Alfred Dahlqvist (13 May 1914 – 21 October 1983) was a Swedish cross-country skier who won a silver medal in the 18 km event at the 1938 World Championships. He won three more medals in 1941, but these are not considered official because of the limited number of competitors. The same year he was awarded the Svenska Dagbladet Gold Medal.

Cross-country skiing results
All results are sourced from the International Ski Federation (FIS).

World Championships
1 medal – (1 silver)

References

1914 births
1983 deaths
People from Bräcke Municipality
Swedish male cross-country skiers
FIS Nordic World Ski Championships medalists in cross-country skiing